Boneh-ye Baba Zahed (also Romanized as Boneh-ye Bābā Zāhed; also known as Bābā Zāhed and Boneh Seyyed) is a village in Qaleh-ye Khvajeh Rural District, in the Central District of Andika County, Khuzestan Province, Iran. At the 2006 census, its population was 79, in 17 families.

References 

Populated places in Andika County